Harry Benton “Ben” Reed is an American retired professional football player who played defensive end. He played in the National Football League (NFL) for the New England Patriots for three games during the 1987 season.

High school and college 
Reed played football at Woodlawn High School in Old Jefferson, Louisiana and at University of Mississippi.

Professional career 
In the 1986 NFL Draft, Reed was selected by the Tampa Bay Buccaneers in the 10th round with the 250th overall pick. In the 1987 NFL season, Reed played in weeks 3, 4, and 5 with the New England Patriots, for the only three regular season appearances of his NFL career.  A shoulder injury forced him into retirement.

Personal life 
Benton Reed's son, Michael Reed, is a professional baseball player in Major League Baseball (MLB) for the San Francisco Giants.

References 

Living people
1963 births
New England Patriots players
American football defensive ends
Ole Miss Rebels football players